Oregon Watershed Enhancement Board (OWEB), a state agency of Oregon in the United States, provides grants to restore watershed health and improve local streams, rivers, wetlands and natural areas in Oregon. Board membership includes commissioners of Oregon's Natural Resources Board and members of the public.

History 
The Governor's Watershed Enhancement Board GWEB) was established in 1987 and began accepting applications to fund watershed improvement projects in November of that year.  

The World of Coos Bay reported the board's charge: 

In the primary election on May 17, 1988, Oregon voters approved Measure 1, authorizing loans for fish protection and watershed restoration.  In 1993, Senate Bill 81 of the Legislature provided $10 million for the Grande Ronde in Northeastern Oregon, and the South Coast and Rogue Basins in Southwestern Oregon, a pilot project known as the Oregon Watershed Health Program. It became part of GWEB in 1995.

In 1998, voterts also approved Measure 66, dedicating some Lottery funding to parks, beaches, habitat, and watershed protection. The following year, the Oregon Watershed Enhancement Board replaced GWEB, and expanded the five member board with six public members. 

Passage of Measure 76 in Oregon's 2010 General Election continued lottery funding for parks, beaches, wildlife habitat, watershed protection beyond 2014 and modified the funding process.

In November 2020 OWEB led a Stage Zero River Restoration Workshop with panels moderated by Prof. Colin Thorne. They also played a role in the creation of a Stage Zero website to encourage similar restoration projects.

Board membership and budget 
As of 2019, Board membership includes six voting members of the public, five voting commissioners of the state's Natural Resource Board, and seven advisory non-voting members. Oregon's Secretary of State described the board's work: "Community members and landowners use scientific criteria to decide jointly what needs to be done to conserve and improve rivers and natural habitats in the places where they live." The OWEB 2019–2021 biennium budget approved by the legislature totaled $138,910,142 USD.

See also 

 Oregon Department of Environmental Quality
 Oregon Department of Fish and Wildlife

References

External links 

1987 establishments in Oregon
State agencies of Oregon
State wildlife and natural resource agencies of the United States